Mercer County Courthouse may refer to:

 Mercer County Courthouse (Illinois), Aledo, Illinois
 Mercer County Courthouse (New Jersey), Trenton, New Jersey
 Mercer County Courthouse (Pennsylvania), Mercer, Pennsylvania
 Mercer County Courthouse (West Virginia), Princeton, West Virginia